Beşkonak (literally "five mansions " or "five inns" in Turkish) may refer to the following places in Turkey:

 Beşkonak, Bucak
 Beşkonak, Gerede, a village in the district of Gerede, Bolu Province
 Beşkonak, Kozluk, a village in the district of Kozluk, Batman Province
 Beşkonak, Kızılcahamam, a village in the district of Kızılcahamam, Ankara Province